Bilenky Cycle Works is an American handmade bicycle manufacturer located in Philadelphia, Pennsylvania.

Information
Founded by Stephen Bilenky, a member of the musical group The Notekillers, in 1983, BCW fabricates both frames and complete bicycles, ranging from TIG welded track bikes to intricately lugged tandems. BCW has been featured in many bicycle publications, art shows, and is a frequent winner of national awards. Most Bilenky frames are steel although titanium is being used with more frequency. Bilenky has installed tens of thousands of S&S couplers, both in their own bikes and other brands.

Bilenky Cycle Works is located at 5319 N. 2nd St. Philadelphia, PA 19120. Bilenky sponsors the Junkyard Cyclocross Race and co-sponsors the Philly Bike Expo. In 2021, Bilenky was commissioned by the United States government to manufacture a custom-built bicycle as a diplomatic gift presented to UK Prime Minister Boris Johnson at the 47th G7 summit.

Models
 Ultralite Classic Road - Road bike
 Tourlite Sport - a sport touring/randonneuring bike.
 Midlands Touring - a long wheelbase touring bike with low bracket.
 Hedgehog - mountain bike
 MetroLuxe  - city bike/commuter bike
 Tandems - Tandem bike
 Chuckwagon - cargo bike
 Viewpoint - a proprietary semi-recumbent tandem with independent stoker pedaling.
 Nor'easter - a cyclo-cross bicycle
 Track - a track bike

Model Levels
All models come in the following versions:
 Deluxe Series  - tig welded construction, custom materials, braze-ons, and color results in a bike built just for the rider.
 Signature - offers hand finished, fillet brazing, or silver brazed hand-detailed lugs.
 Artisan - one-of-a-kind metal work that distinguishes each frame as a unique creation with specifications as determined by the riders' measurements, style, and intended use.

References

External links
Official Website
Official Blog Site
News Duet Bike Blog

Cycle manufacturers of the United States
Mountain bike manufacturers
Manufacturing companies based in Philadelphia
Cycling in Pennsylvania
Vehicle manufacturing companies established in 1983
1983 establishments in Pennsylvania